Bituminaria is small genus of perennial herbs in the bean family.

Species
 Bituminaria acaulis (Hoffm.) C.H. Stirt.
 Bituminaria bituminosa (L.) C.H. Stirt.
Bituminaria flaccida (Nábělek) Greuter
 Bituminaria morisiana (Pignatti & Metlesics) Greuter

References

External links

Psoraleeae
Fabaceae genera